The 2005 Saint Francis Cougars football team represented the University of Saint Francis, located in Fort Wayne, Indiana, in the 2005 NAIA football season. They were led by head coach Kevin Donley, who served his 8th year as the first and only head coach in the history of Saint Francis football.  The Cougars played their home games at Bishop John M. D'Arcy Stadium and were members of the Mid-States Football Association (MSFA) Mideast League (MEL). The Cougars finished in 1st place in the MSFA MEL division, and they received an automatic bid to the 2005 postseason NAIA playoffs.

The 2005 Cougars finished the regular season undefeated.  In the postseason playoffs, the Cougars advanced to the national championship game where they lost to the Fighting Saints of Carroll, 27-10.

Schedule 
(13-1 overall, 7-0 conference)
The 2005 season saw a rematch of the 2004 NAIA championship game.  Once again, the Cougars finished as runner-up to Carroll (MT).  For the three seasons 2003-2005, the USF record was 38-3, with all 3 losses coming as season-ending losses to Carroll (MT).

Ranking movements

References

Saint Francis
Saint Francis Cougars football seasons
Saint Francis Cougars football